Scott Wayne Barnes Jr. (born August 1, 2001) is an American professional basketball player for the Toronto Raptors of the National Basketball Association (NBA). He played college basketball for the Florida State Seminoles, earning third-team all-conference honors in the Atlantic Coast Conference (ACC) as a freshman in 2021 and was selected with the fourth overall pick by the Raptors in the 2021 NBA draft.    Barnes was named the NBA Rookie of the Year in 2022.

High school career
As a freshman, Barnes played basketball for Cardinal Newman High School in West Palm Beach, Florida. He earned All-Area second team and MaxPreps Freshman All-American honors after leading Newman to a 19–8 record and the 5A regional semifinals. After the season, Barnes transferred to NSU University School in Fort Lauderdale, Florida, where he was teammates with Vernon Carey Jr., the nation's highest-ranked junior.

As a sophomore, he helped his team to a 36–2 record and its first-ever Class 5A state title. Barnes led University School to a City of Palms Classic championship and was named tournament most valuable player (MVP) after posting 15 points and eight rebounds in the final versus top-ranked East High School. At GEICO Nationals, he averaged 21.3 points and 9.7 rebounds per game as University School finished as runners-up. In his junior season, Barnes averaged 13.1 points, seven rebounds and 4.8 assists per game, leading his team to a 27–5 record and a second straight 5A state title, despite Carey being sidelined for the championship game. The team included freshmen Taylor Hendricks and Jett Howard.

On August 5, 2019, he announced that he was moving to Montverde Academy in Montverde, Florida, joining top recruits Cade Cunningham and Day'Ron Sharpe, for his senior season. Many analysts regarded his team as one of the greatest in high school basketball history. Barnes averaged 11.6 points, 6.5 rebounds and 4.6 assists per game, helping Montverde to a 25–0 record with an average margin of victory of 39 points. He received All-American first team honors from MaxPreps and Sports Illustrated. Barnes was selected to play in the McDonald's All-American Game, Jordan Brand Classic and Nike Hoop Summit, but all three games were canceled due to the COVID-19 pandemic.

Recruiting
A consensus five-star recruit, Barnes was considered the fourth-best player in the 2020 recruiting class by ESPN. He was the highest ranked power forward in his class by ESPN and Rivals. On October 14, 2019, Barnes announced his commitment to play college basketball for Florida State over offers from Kentucky, Miami (Florida) and Oregon, among others.

College career 

On March 13, 2021, Barnes scored a career-high 21 points in an 80–75 loss to Georgia Tech at the ACC tournament championship. As a freshman, he averaged 10.3 points, 4.1 assists, 4 rebounds and 1.5 steals per game, earning ACC Freshman of the Year, ACC Sixth Man of the Year and third-team All-ACC honors. On April 9, he declared for the 2021 NBA draft, forgoing his remaining college eligibility.

Professional career

Toronto Raptors (2021–present)
Barnes was selected with the fourth overall pick in the 2021 NBA draft by the Toronto Raptors. The selection was a surprise to many as the consensus was the Raptors would select Gonzaga point guard Jalen Suggs. On August 8, 2021, he signed a contract with the Raptors. On October 20, Barnes made his NBA debut, putting up 12 points, nine rebounds, and one assist in a 98–83 loss to the Washington Wizards. On October 22, he put up his first career double-double with 25 points and 13 rebounds in a 115–83 win over the Boston Celtics. On January 21, 2022, Barnes recorded a then career-high 27 points, along with eight rebounds, in a 109–105 win over the Washington Wizards. On February 25, he put up a then career-high 28 points, along with five rebounds and two steals, in a 125–93 loss to the Charlotte Hornets. On February 28, Barnes tied a then career-high 28 points in a 133–97 win over the Brooklyn Nets. On March 3, he was named the Eastern Conference Rookie of the Month for February. On March 18, Barnes put up a then career-high 31 points with 17 rebounds in a 128–123 overtime loss to the Los Angeles Lakers. Starting all the 74 games he played, Barnes finished the season averaging 15.3 points, 7.2 rebounds, 3.5 assists, 1.1 steals, and .7 blocks per game, while shooting .492, .301, and .735 from the field, the three-point line, and on free throws, respectively, on 35.4 minutes per game. Among rookies, he had the best win shares (6.6) and value over replacement player (1.9). In addition, he was the only rookie to rank in the top five in total points, rebounds, assists, steals, and blocks, and led the Raptors to No. 5 in the Eastern Conference for a direct playoff spot. On April 23, Barnes was named the 2021–22 NBA Rookie of the Year. His 15-point difference over the runner-up, Evan Mobley, was the smallest voting margin in 19 years since the current voting format began in 2002–03. Barnes became the first Raptor to win the award in 23 years since Vince Carter won it in 1999, and the third ever Raptor to win the award along with Carter, and Damon Stoudamire.

On November 4, 2022, Barnes achieved his first career triple-double with 11 points, 11 rebounds, and 10 assists in a 111–110 loss to the Dallas Mavericks. On March 10, 2023, Barnes put up a career-high 32 points in a 122–112 loss to the Los Angeles Lakers.

National team career
Barnes won a gold medal with the United States at the 2017 FIBA Under-16 Americas Championship in Formosa, Argentina after averaging 9.8 points, 3.2 rebounds and 2.4 steals per game. In a semifinal win over Argentina, he led all scorers with 20 points and six steals while breaking the American under-16 record for free throw percentage by shooting 8-of-8 from the free throw line. At the 2018 FIBA Under-17 World Cup in Argentina, Barnes averaged 9.5 points and 5.8 rebounds per game and captured another gold medal. He averaged 9.7 points, 4.9 rebounds and 2.7 assists per game at the 2019 FIBA Under-19 World Cup in Heraklion, Greece, where he won his third gold medal with the United States.

Personal life
Barnes' father is Jamaican and many of his relatives are Canadian.

Player profile
Although listed as a forward, he played the guard position in college and Toronto has seized on his playmaking ability by using him as a secondary ball handler. Barnes' biggest weaknesses are both his 3 point shooting and free throw shooting as he shot below 30% from three (27.5%) and just above 60% from the free throw line (62.5%) in college.

Career statistics

NBA

Regular season

|-
| style="text-align:left;"| 
| style="text-align:left;"| Toronto
| 74 || 74 || 35.4 || .492 || .301 || .735 || 7.5 || 3.5 || 1.1 || .7 || 15.3
|- class="sortbottom"
| style="text-align:center;" colspan="2"| Career
| 74 || 74 || 35.4 || .492 || .301 || .735 || 7.5 || 3.5 || 1.1 || .7 || 15.3

Playoffs

|-
| style="text-align:left;"|2022
| style="text-align:left;"|Toronto
| 4 || 3 || 33.3 || .429 || .167 || .813 || 9.0 || 4.3 || 1.0 || .3 || 12.8
|- class="sortbottom"
| style="text-align:center;" colspan="2"|Career
| 4 || 3 || 33.3 || .429 || .167 || .813 || 9.0 || 4.3 || 1.0 || .3 || 12.8

College 

|-
| style="text-align:left;"| 2020–21
| style="text-align:left;"| Florida State
| 24 || 7 || 24.8 || .503 || .275 || .621 || 4.0 || 4.1 || 1.5 || .5 || 10.3

References

External Links

 Scottie Barnes on Twitter
 Florida State Seminoles bio
 Montverde Academy Eagles bio
 USA Basketball bio

2001 births
Living people
American expatriate basketball people in Canada
American men's basketball players
American sportspeople of Jamaican descent
Basketball players from Florida
Florida State Seminoles men's basketball players
McDonald's High School All-Americans
Montverde Academy alumni
NSU University School alumni
Power forwards (basketball)
Toronto Raptors draft picks
Toronto Raptors players